Fužine may refer to: 

Fusine in Valromana, a frazione of Tarvisio, Italy, known as Fužine in Slovene
Fužine Castle, a castle in Ljubljana, Slovenia
Fužine, Croatia, a village and municipality in Primorje–Gorski Kotar County, Croatia
Fužine, Gorenja Vas–Poljane, a settlement in the Municipality of Gorenja Vas–Poljane, Slovenia
Fužine, Kamnik, a former settlement in central Slovenia, now part of the town of Kamnik
Fužine (Ljubljana), a former settlement in central Slovenia, now part of the city of Ljubljana
Nove Fužine, a neighborhood of Ljubljana, Slovenia